Rocket Dog is an American private company that designs and manufactures women's shoes based in Hayward, California. They were founded in 1997 in Southern California, and were named after one of the two founders' pet dog, who enjoyed running on the beach. Their initial product lines emphasized beach and casual wear, and now includes a full range of women's shoe styles. Their shoes are sold in Europe and Israel as well as the US. They expanded their UK business in 2012, starting from a base of about 120 retailers there.

References

External links
Rocket Dog US website

American companies established in 1997
Clothing companies established in 1997
Shoe companies of the United States
Companies based in Hayward, California
1997 establishments in California